Arain (also known as Raeen) are a large Punjabi agricultural tribe with a strong political identity and level of organisation, found mainly in the Pakistani provinces of Punjab and Sindh with a small population in parts of Indian Punjab, Uttar Pradesh and Uttarakhand.

Origins
The historian and political scientist Christophe Jaffrelot believes that the Arain are displaced farming communities who moved to Punjab from Sindh and Multan as Arab Muslim armies encroached; they originally practised Hinduism but many later converted to Islam. He says that the community is related to the Kamboj Rajput community mainly located in northern India and eastern Pakistan.

Ishtiaq Ahmed, a political scientist who is also a member of the Arain community, acknowledges that some early Arain texts ascribe a Suryavanshi Rajput origin, while others note a Persian one to reflect to others the status of being "conquerors". He believes that the Arains "are a mix of many ethnicities and races", similar to other "farming castes of the Punjab and Haryana".

History
According to Ahmed, during the Mughal and Sikh periods Arain held prominent positions, such as governors and army generals; he also believes that numerous names adopted by the community may indicate a tradition of military employment.

During the Indian rebellion of 1857, Shah Abdul Qadir Ludhianvi, an Arain, led an uprising from Ludhiana to Delhi where he was killed. In the aftermath, the British viewed the Arain as a disloyal community, and categorised them as a non-martial caste which denied them entry into the Bengal Army. Due to lobbying by the Arain community, in the early 20th century the Arain were officially re-classified as an "agricultural tribe", then effectively synonymous with the martial race classification.

Traditionally associated with farming, when the British wanted land developed in the Punjab, Arain were brought in to cultivate lands around cities, and were one of the agricultural communities given preference to assist with opening up the agrarian frontier in the Canal Colonies between 1885 and 1940. Shahid Javed Burki says that the British favoured the Arain for their "hard work, frugality and sense of discipline". The development of towns and cities and increasing urbanisation resulted in the value of the land settled by Arain to rise significantly, and Arain families flourished. Education was prioritised with the new-found wealth and Arain came to dominate the legal profession amongst urban Punjabi Muslims. Many used law to enter politics.

During the colonial era, detailed decadal census reports covered the plethora of castes, subcastes and tribes that existed throughout British India. Information regarding the Arains was highlighted in census reports taken from Punjab Province.

Organisation
Several meetings were held to establish an organisation to represent the Arain community in the 1890s. Eventually, in 1915, Anjuman Ra’iyan-i-Hind emerged as such a body in Lahore and a national community newspaper, titled Al-Rai, was established.

Culture
The Arains are in majority in Lahore and this biradari is also active in industrial and commercial activities. A few families play a significant role in the politics of Lahore at national and local level.

Diaspora 
There are several diasporic Arain communities in British towns and cities, such as Manchester, Glasgow and Oxford. The tribe has its own organisation, Arain Council UK, which was established as Anjuman-e-Arains in the 1980s and renamed in 2008.

British Conservative Party politician Sajid Javid's family were farmers from the village of Rajana near Toba Tek Singh, Punjab, from where they migrated to the UK in the 1960s; Javid speaks some Punjabi. Javid was the first British Asian to hold one of the British Great Offices of State, being first Home Secretary (2018–2019) and then Chancellor of the Exchequer (2019–2020).

Notable people 
 

Sonia Ahmed, President of Miss Pakistan World Mrs. Pakistan World
Adina Beg, last Mughal Governor of Punjab.
Mian Shah Din, first Muslim judge at the Chief Court of the Punjab
Mian Iftikharuddin, activist and politician, founder of the Pakistan Times
Sajid Javid, former British Home Secretary and Chancellor of the Exchequer
Sir Mian Abdul Rashid, first Chief Justice of Pakistan
Anas Sarwar, leader of the Scottish Labour Party
Chaudhry Mohammad Sarwar, businessman, Labour Party MP and 33rd Governor of the Punjab
Sir Mian Muhammad Shafi, lawyer and co-founder of All-India Muslim League
Jahanara Shahnawaz, politician and All-India Muslim League activist
Sir Mian Muhammad Shahnawaz, politician
Muhammad Zia-ul-Haq, the 6th President of Pakistan
Abdul Hafeez Kardar, Pakistani cricketer, politician and diplomat

References

Further reading

 
Punjabi tribes
Social groups of Punjab, Pakistan
Social groups of Sindh
Social groups of Uttar Pradesh